The 1932 Balkan Cup was the third Balkan Cup football tournament. The national teams of Yugoslavia, Greece, Bulgaria and Romania took part and it was won by Bulgaria. The top goalscorer was Živković, with Yugoslavia.

Final standings

Matches

Winner

Statistics

Goalscorers

References 

1932–33
1932–33 in European football
1932–33 in Romanian football
1932–33 in Bulgarian football
1932–33 in Greek football
1932–33 in Yugoslav football